John Gahagan (born 24 August 1958) is a Scottish former footballer, who played as a left winger. Gahagan spent most of his career with Motherwell, spending twelve seasons with the Fir Park club, either side of spells with Clydebank latterly Morton. During his time at Fir Park, Gahagan picked up two Scottish Football League First Division titles.

A fully qualified SFA coach, Gahagan worked as a football development officer in Clackmannanshire before becoming an after-dinner speaker, winning the MBN trophy after being voted 'Scottish Sporting Speaker of the Year' in 2001.

Honours

Motherwell
 Scottish Football League First Division: 2
 1981-82, 1984-85

References

External links
 Official website
 

1958 births
Footballers from Glasgow
Living people
Scottish footballers
Scottish Football League players
Clydebank F.C. (1965) players
Glasgow United F.C. players
Motherwell F.C. players
Greenock Morton F.C. players
Association football wingers